The Circé-class submarines were a sub-class of the 600 Series of submarines built for the French Navy prior to World War II. There were four vessels in the class, built to a Schneider-Laubeuf design. They were ordered in 1925 and completed by 1927.

The four boats of the Circé class saw action during the Second World War, from September 1939 until the  French armistice in June 1940.

General characteristics
The Circé class had a displacement of 615 tons surfaced and 776 tons submerged. Their armament was seven torpedo tubes (three forward, two midships, and two aft) with an outfit of 13 torpedoes. As with all French submarines of this period, the midships torpedo tubes were fitted externally in trainable mounts. They had a single  deck gun and two  machine guns, and were manned by crews of 41 men.

Ships
  was at Bizerta in June 1940. She was seized in 1942 and became the Italian FR117. She was scuttled in 1943.
  was at Bizerta in June 1940. She was seized in 1942, but wrecked by Allied bombing in 1943.
  was at Toulon in June 1940. She was scuttled there in November 1942.
  was sunk in the North Sea in May 1940 by the German submarine .

See also
 List of submarines of France
 French submarines of World War II

Notes

References
Bagnasco, E :Submarines of World War Two (1977) 
Conway : Conway's All the World's Fighting Ships 1922–1946 (1980) 

Submarine classes
 
 
Ship classes of the French Navy